Opuntia mackensenii is a species of flowering plant in the family Cactaceae, native to west Texas. It was first described by Joseph Nelson Rose in 1911.

References

mackensenii
Flora of Texas
Plants described in 1911